The 2016 Ontario Tankard, the Southern Ontario men's provincial curling championship, was held from February 1 to 7 at the Wayne Gretzky Sports Centre in Brantford, Ontario. The winning Glenn Howard rink represented Ontario at the 2016 Tim Hortons Brier in Ottawa.

The Howard rink from Toronto defeated the John Epping rink (also from Toronto) in the final. It is Howard's 16th provincial championship title (ninth as skip).

Teams

1Spencer was added to the team, replacing Richard Hart, who was bumped up to third, as Howard's regular third, Wayne Middaugh suffered an injury in a skiing accident and will have to miss out the remainder of the season.  
2Scott Bailey, the regular skip of this team was not able to play due work commitments; Fanset skipped the team in his place. Fraser Reid was added as a spare.

Round-robin standings

Results

Draw 1
February 1, 2:00 pm

Draw 2
February 1, 7:00 pm

Draw 3
February 2, 2:00 pm

Draw 4
February 2, 7:00 pm

Draw 5
February 3, 9:00 am

Draw 6
February 3, 2:30 pm

Draw 7
February 3, 7:30 pm

Draw 8
February 4, 2:00 pm

Draw 9
February 4, 7:00

Draw 10
February 5, 2:00 pm

Draw 11
February 5, 7:00 pm

Playoffs

1 vs. 2

3 vs. 4

Semifinal

Final

Qualification
Southern Ontario zones ran from December 18–20, 2015 with regional tournaments held January 2–3. Two teams from each zone qualify to 4 regional tournaments, and two teams from each of the two tournaments qualify to provincials. Two additional teams qualify out of a second chance qualifier. As the defending champion Mark Kean rink disbanded in the off season, the 2015 runner-up John Epping rink from the Dondalda Curling Club automatically qualified in the defending champion berth.

Regional Qualifiers In Bold

Zone Qualification

Zone 1
RCMP Curling Club, Ottawa

Teams entered:

David Coffey (Ottawa)
Willie Jeffries (Ottawa)
Ryan McCrady (Ottawa)
Stephen Watson (Ottawa)

Bracket:

Zone 2
RCMP Curling Club, Ottawa

Teams entered:

J.P. Lachance (Rideau)
Jason Reid (Rideau)
Spencher Richmond (Perth)

Bracket:

Zone 3
RCMP Curling Club, Ottawa

Teams entered:

Josh Adams (Granite of Ottawa West)
Douglas Brewer (Dalhousie Lake)
Colin Dow (Huntley)
Jake Higgs (Pakenham)

Bracket:

Zone 4
Royal Kingston Curling Club, Kingston

Teams entered:

Greg Balsdon (Cataraqui)
Dave Collyer (Quinte)
Rob Dickson (Napanee)
Matt Mills (Cataraqui)

Bracket:

Zone 5
Beaverton Curling Club, Beaverton

Teams entered:

John Bolton (Lindsay)
Scott McDonald (Peterborough)
Jake Speedie (Beaverton)

Bracket:

Zone 6
Uxbridge & District Curling Club, Uxbridge

Teams entered:

Jim Bell (Unionville)
David Fischer (Oshawa Golf)
Rob Houston (Port Perry)
Jake Walker (Annandale)

Bracket:

Zone 7
East York Curling Club, East York

Teams entered:

Dave Coutanche (Richmond Hill)
Brent Gray (Bayview)
Mike Harris (Toronto Cricket)
Rob Lobel (Thornhill)
Jason March (Scarboro)
Darryl Prebble (Scarboro)
Michael Shepherd (Richmond Hill)

Brackets:

Zone 8
Dixie Curling Club, Mississauga

Teams entered:

Roy Arndt (Dixie)
Glenn Howard (St. George's)
Josh Johnston (Royals)
Dennis Moretto (Dixie)
Patrick Morris (High Park)
Guy Racette (Royals)
Rob Retchless (Royals)
Craig Shinde (Dixie)

Brackets:

Zone 9
Orangeville Curling Club, Orangeville

Teams entered:

Travis Belchior (Orangeville)
Dayna Deruelle (Brampton) 
Ian Dickie (King)
Michael McGaugh (Chinguacousy)

Brackets:

Zone 10
Parry Sound Curling Club, Parry Sound

Teams entered:

Al Bourgeois (Parry Sound)
Chris Wimmer (Stroud)

Both teams qualify as there were no other entries.

Zone 11
Paisley Curling Club, Paisley

Teams entered:

Cory Heggestad (Markdale)
Jon St. Denis (Markdale)

Both teams qualify as there were no other entries.

Zone 12
Galt Curling Club, Cambridge

Teams entered:

Mark Kean (Kitchener-Waterloo Granite)
Richard Krell (Kitchener-Waterloo Granite)
Damien Villard (Galt Country)

Brackets:

Zone 13
St. Catharines Curling Club, St. Catharines

Teams entered:

Bill Buchanan (Welland)
Pat Ferris (Grimsby)
Simon Ouellet (Glendale)

Brackets:

Zone 14
Palmerston Curling Club, Palmerston

Teams entered:

Mike Benjamins (Palmerston) 
Ethan Doig (Seaforth)
Brent Ross (Harriston)
Daryl Shane (Wingham)

Brackets:

Zone 15
Ingersoll & District Curling Club, Ingersoll

Teams entered:

Scott Bailey (Ingersoll)
Terry Corbin (Brant)
Wayne Tuck, Jr. (Brant)

Brackets:

Zone 16
Glencoe & District Curling Club, Glencoe

Teams entered:

Mark Bice (Sarnia)
Don Bourques (Sarnia)
Mike Drake (Kingsville)
Dale Kelly (Chatham Granite)
Ryan LeDrew (Sarnia)
Kirk Massey (London)
John Young (Chatham Granite)

Brackets:

Regional qualification

Region 1
Rideau Curling Club, Ottawa

Region 2
Leaside Curling Club, East York

Region 3
Wiarton Curling Club, Wiarton

Region 4
Stratford Country Club, Stratford

Challenge Round
January 15–17 at the Penetanguishene Curling Club, Penetanguishene

New teams:
Eric Bradey (St. Catharines)

Notes:
Codey Maus skipping Scott McDonald rink.

References

External links
Official site

Ontario Tankard
Ontario Tankard
Sport in Brantford
Ontario Tankard